Vallathol Narayana Menon (Malayalam: വള്ളത്തോൾ നാരായണ മേനോൻ)  (16 October 1878 – 13 March 1958) was a Malayalam poet and one of the triumvirate of modern Malayalam poetry, along with Asan and Ulloor. The honorific Mahākavi (great poet) was applied to him in 1913 after the publication of his Mahakavya Chitrayogam. He was a nationalist poet and wrote a series of poems on various aspects of the Indian freedom movement. He also wrote against the caste system, the tyranny of the British and Brahmanas and other social orthodoxies. He founded the Kerala Kalamandalam and is credited with revitalising the traditional Keralite dance form known as Kathakali.

Early life
Vallathol was born in Chennara, Mangalam, Tirur, in Malappuram District, Kerala, as the son of Kadungotte Mallisseri Damodaran Elayathu and Kuttipparu Amma. He did not receive any formal education but was trained in Sanskrit language, first under the Sanskrit scholar Variyam Parambil Kunjan Nair and then under his own uncle Ramunni Menon, who introduced him into the world of Sanskrit poetry. Ramunni Menon also taught him Ashtanga Hridayam, a medical treatise, and young Narayana Menon soon began helping his uncle in medical practice and teaching. He also trained for a year under Parakkulam Subrahmanya Sastri and Kaikkulangara Rama Variar in Philosophy and Logic. He married Vanneri Chittazhiveettil Madhavi Amma in November 1901 and shifted to Thrissur, the cultural capital of Kerala. He worked as manager in the Kalpadrumam Press in Thrissur from 1905 to 1910. During this period, his hearing began to deteriorate. From 1915, he started working in Keralodayam newspaper and later joined Amrit Ritesh, a journal published from Thrissur.

Poetry
He started writing poems from the age of twelve. Kiratha Satakam and Vyasavataram were his earliest published works. He won Bhashaposhini magazine's poetry award in 1894. His poems began appearing in Bhashaposhini, Kerala Sanchari and Vijnana Chintamani magazines. His first major literary ventures was a rendition of Valmiki's Ramayana into Malayalam, the work of which started in 1905 and took two years to complete. Unlike some of his contemporaries, Vallathol did not have any acquaintance with English language. He earned the title Mahakavi after the publication of the Mahakavya Chitrayogam in 1913. Chitrayogam conformed to all the principles of a traditional Mahakavya and was divided into 18 Sargas. The story of Chandrasena and Taravali, taken from Kathasaritsagara, was the theme of this poetry work. Vallathol portrayed the protest of Parvati against Siva in the work Gangapati (1913) and of Usha defying her father for the sake of her love in Bandhanasthanaya Anirudhan (1914).  In 1917, the first of his eleven-volume work Sahitya Manjari (A Bouquet of Literature) was published. These volumes, published from 1917 to 1970, contain his collected short romantic poems dealing with a variety of themes. Many of these poems earlier appeared in P. V. Krishna Variar's Kavanakaumudi magazine. His khanda kavya on Mary Magdalene titled Magdalana Mariam paved the way for a new tradition in of Christian symbolism in Malayalam. The poet's own struggle with deafness from his early twenties features in the work Badhiravilapam. Other celebrated short poems of Vallathol include Sishyanum Makanum, Virasinkala, Achanum Makalum, Divaswapnam, and Ente Gurukulam.

In addition to subjects from nature and the lives of ordinary people, Vallathol's opposition to the indignities of the caste system and the injustices suffered by the poor form the themes of many of his poems. He is also regarded as the greatest nationalist poet of the language. He was one of the triumvirate poets of modern Malayalam, along with Kumaran Asan and Ulloor S. Parameswara Iyer. Literary critic K. M. George has noted that, together with Kumaran Asan, Vallathol was "responsible for bringing about a revolutionary change in Malayalam poetry in the [nineteen]-twenties. Asan concentrated on social themes and Vallathol championed the national movement; yet both made very significant contributions to the khandkavya, ie: the short poem of the lyrical type."

The title "Kavisarvabhowman" was conferred upon him by the Maharaja of Cochin.
He was awarded Padma Bhushan title, India's third highest civilian award, in 1954.

Kathakali
Vallathol is credited with revitalising Kathakali. He played a prominent role in setting up the Kerala Kalamandalam at Cheruthuruthy, near the banks of Bharathapuzha River. The revival of the art of Kathakali in modern Kerala was mainly due to the efforts of Vallathol and the Kerala Kalamandalam. He stimulated the world's interest in this art during his tours abroad between 1950 and 1953.

Involvement in Nationalist movement
Vallathol was a nationalist poet writing in the Malayalam language. He actively participated in the Nationalist movement. He attended the all India Conferences of the Indian Congress in 1922 and 1927 and rejected a royal honour bestowed upon him by the Prince of Wales during his India visit in 1922. Vallathol remained a great admirer of Mahatma Gandhi and wrote the poem "Ente Gurunathan" ("My Great Teacher") in his praise. At the same time, he felt attracted by the Communist ideology and wrote poems praising the achievements of the Soviet Union. He wrote several patriotic poems hailing India's nationalist movement.

Bibliography
The following is a list of works published by Vallathol Narayana Menon. The bibliographical details of subsequent editions are used wherever the details of the first edition are not available. Kerala University published a bibliography of the author in 1978 titled Vallathol Bibliography.

Poetry

Translations

Others

See also
 Vallathol Award

References

External links

 Biographical sketch, Portrait, Handwriting and Books of Vallathol – Kerala Sahitya Akademi
Ente Gurunathan Poem Lyrics
Vallathol Narayana Menon Poems - Collection of Poem Lyrics
Ente Basha Poem Lyrics - Vallathol Narayana Menon
Mathruvandanam Poem Lyrics - Vallathol Narayana Menon
List of Vallathol Narayana Menon Poems

1958 deaths
Malayali people
Indian male poets
People from Malappuram district
Malayalam-language writers
Malayalam poets
Kathakali
Indian Sanskrit scholars
Recipients of the Padma Bhushan in literature & education
1878 births
Deaf poets
19th-century Indian poets
20th-century Indian poets
Poets from Kerala
19th-century Indian male writers
Indian deaf people
20th-century Indian male writers
Translators of Kalidasa